Pa Mazar (also Romanized as Pā Mazār and Pā-ye Mazār; also known as Deh-e Restegār (Persian: ده رستگار) and Deh-e Rastegārī) is a village in Kuh Panj Rural District, in the Central District of Bardsir County, Kerman Province, Iran. At the 2006 census, its population was 42, in 12 families.

References 

Populated places in Bardsir County